Norman Winslow Sharp (26 November 1919 – 1977) was an English professional footballer who played as an inside-right.

Career
Sharp joined Everton in November 1938, however he did not make a single senior appearance for the club. He did, however, guest for them 8 times during the war.

He also guested for Leeds United during the war.

After the war, he signed for Wrexham where he make his professional debut and would go on make 122 league appearances for Wrexham, before retiring from football.

Sharp died in 1977.

References

1919 births
1977 deaths
English footballers
English Football League players
Everton F.C. players
Wrexham A.F.C. players
Everton F.C. wartime guest players
Leeds United F.C. wartime guest players
Footballers from Liverpool
Association football inside forwards